The Squash Rackets Federation of India or SRFI is the Indian governmental apex body for the game of squash. It conducts the National Squash Championship, and promotes the game through the state level squash bodies, and provides training facilities and selects the squad for the Indian team.  It also chooses coaches for the national team (presently Cyrus Poncha and Major S. Maniam). The rise of squash worldwide with many players in the top 100 worldwide and India's higher rankings worldwide are a testament to the hard work put in by the administrators and players over the last decade.

Among the major facilities created by the SRFI is the Indian Squash Academy, which hosted the World Team Championship in 2007.

Conflict between the SRFI and squash athletes came to a fore in 2005, when the government was conferring the Dronacharya Award on SRFI affiliated squash coach Cyrus Poncha. India's number one squash player Joshna Chinappa wrote a letter to the Ministry of Sports and Youth Affairs that she never trained under Poncha, and that he had misused her name to get the Dronacharya Award.
The SRFI chairman Ramachandran then produced testimonials from Joshna where she acknowledges the support of SRFI and Poncha.

In 2008, the SRFI chose a woman's squad for the Asian championships without Dipika Pallikal, who was then training in Egypt, after having recently won the under-17 British Junior Open. The federation cited irregularities in the paperwork in informing the group about her absence due to training, but it was felt that this might have been a rivalry with the Mittal Champions Trust which had been sponsoring her training abroad.

The SRFI maintains the website,  which announces the national squash calendar and other details.

SRFI manages two squads that represent India in international squash: the India men's national squash team, the India women's national squash team.

Activities 
The various activities conducted by the SRFI during the year include:

 Coaching camps
 Tournaments (national and international)
 Daily training at the Indian Squash Academy
 Referee clinics
 Participates in international competitions
 Level 1, 2 & 3 coaching courses
 Development activities at tier 2 and 3 cities

Rise of Indian squash

Postings
In February 2015, the federation appointed Harish Prasad as the national development officer. Since his appointment, squash in India has seen steady risen as he has focussed on conducting events for players, coaches and referees. Harish has been instrumental in implementing various initiatives for the development of the game.

In June 2015, Debendranath Sarangi and K Rajendiran were elected unopposed as president and secretary-general respectively of the Squash Rackets Federation of India at its Extraordinary General Meeting.

In July 2016, Egyptian coach Ashraf el Karagui was appointed by the Sports Authority of India to serve Indian squash. Within a short span he has made significant difference to the junior and senior players. Currently India's top two players, Joshna Chinappa and Dipika Pallikal Karthik train with Ashraf and praise him for the changes he has brought to their game.

In February 2017, Debendranath Sarangi was elected as the vice-president of the Asia Squash Federation with a two-thirds majority at the 37th ASF Annual General Meeting. Sarangi is the second Indian to become the vice-president of the ASF.

In July 2017, SRFI President Debendranath Sarangi was elected as a member of the World Squash Federation's ethics committee.

See also
 India men's national squash team
 India women's national squash team

References

External links

Squash
Squash in India
India
Year of establishment missing